Rodríguez, supernumerario is a 1948 Argentine film.

Cast

External links
 

1948 films
1940s Spanish-language films
Argentine black-and-white films
Argentine comedy-drama films
1948 comedy-drama films
Films directed by Enrique Cahen Salaberry
1940s Argentine films